The British Columbia Legislature Cenotaph, also known as the Victoria Cenotaph and the War Memorial to the Unknown Soldier, is a war memorial, installed outside the British Columbia Parliament Buildings in Victoria, British Columbia, Canada. Unveiled by Lt.-Gov. W.C. Nichol on July 12, 1925, the granite cenotaph commemorates the sacrifices of Canadian Forces personnel and citizens during both World Wars, the Korean War and peacekeeping missions. The bronze statue was designed by sculptors Vernon and Sidney March.

References

External links
 

1925 establishments in British Columbia
1925 sculptures
Bronze sculptures in British Columbia
Granite sculptures in Canada
Korean War memorials and cemeteries
Monuments and memorials in British Columbia
Outdoor sculptures in Victoria, British Columbia
Sculptures of men in Canada
Statues in Canada
World War I memorials in Canada
World War II memorials in Canada